Juraj Kucka (born 26 February 1987), also known by his nickname Kuco, is a Slovak professional footballer who plays as a midfielder for Slovak club Slovan Bratislava and the Slovakia national team.

Club career

Early career
Kucka made his Corgoň Liga debut for Ružomberok on 11 March 2007. He played six games in his first season. Overall, Kucka played 49 games and scored eight goals for Ružomberok. Czech manager Michal Bílek, coaching Ružomberok in 2008, recommended Kucka for Sparta Praha. In January 2009, he has signed a three-year contract for Sparta. In 2009–10 season he won the champions.

Genoa
On 6 January 2011, he signed a four-and-a-half-year contract for €3.55 million transfer fee with Genoa (later extended one more year to 30 June 2016). He made his debut in the Coppa Italia match against Inter Milan on 12 January 2011. He was voted man of the match by Genoa fans after 1–1 draw against AC Milan on 6 February 2011. Kucka proved immediately to fit fine in the squad, showing a remarkable physical strength and good technical skills, resulting the second best player of Genoa. He scored his first goal for Genoa in a 2–1 away win against Lazio Rome on 18 September 2011.

On 31 August 2011, the last day of transfer window, Inter Milan and Genoa came to an agreement to swap co-ownerships of Juraj Kucka (€8 million) and Emiliano Viviano (€5 million). In June 2012 Kucka returned to Genoa where he spent 2011–12 season on loan for just €6.5 million, co-currently Samuele Longo returned to Inter for €7 million.

AC Milan
On 28 August 2015, Kucka was signed by AC Milan for €3 million transfer fee. However, Milan also paid an unknown parties an additional €1 million. He made his debut on 29 August 2015 in a 2–1 home win against Empoli, and scored his first Milan goal on 9 January 2016 to equalize against AS Roma in a 1–1 draw.

Trabzonspor
On 7 July 2017, Kucka was signed by Trabzonspor on a three-year contract worth €2.25 million a season, for a transfer fee of €5 million. He became a third Slovak player to join Trabzonspor in 2016–17 period, after Matúš Bero and Ján Ďurica. The trio was later joined by left-back Tomáš Hubočan, on a loan from Olympique Marseille. By the start of 2018–19 season, Kucka was the only remaining Slovak in the team. In total, Kucka scored three goals in 38 competitive games for Trabzonspor.

Parma
Kucka returned to Italy on 14 January 2019, when he joined Parma. He commented that he intended to score more goals in Parma and improve from where he left of, when he left Italy a year and a half ago.

He debuted for Parma in his first opportunity, when he came on as a substitute for Alessandro Deiola in the 73rd minute of a Serie A away fixture against Udinese. Parma won the game 2–1 by goals of Roberto Inglese and Gervinho.

In his third appearance for Parma, Kucka got his first two assists with the side. On 2 February, he assisted Barillà in the 64th minute and Ivorian international Gervinho in the 74th minute. Parma had managed to upset Juventus away, who were at the top of the league table, by coming back from a two-goal margin twice, to tie the game 3–3. Kucka played 86 minutes of the game.

He scored his first goal after the return to Italy in his fifth match, on 16 February 2019 against Cagliari after an assist from Massimo Gobbi, setting the score to 1–0 for Parma. However two second-half goals by Leonardo Pavoletti meant Parma lost the game 2–1.

Parma completed the season 14th with 41 points, three points above the relegation zone. Kucka scored a total of four goals, connecting one each against Genoa, Chievo Verona and Sampdoria.

Watford
On 6 August 2021, it was announced that Kucka had signed for newly promoted Premier League club Watford. Parma confirmed on the same day that the transfer is a season-long loan.
On 14 August 2021, he made his Watford debut in their league opener against Aston Villa, where Watford won 3–2. He scored his first goal for the club in a 5–2 win away against Everton.

Slovan Bratislava
Following Watford's relegation from the Premier League, Kucka signed a two-year contract with reigning Slovak champions of the past four seasons Slovan Bratislava, where he was to be managed by Vladimír Weiss under whom Kucka debuted in the Slovak national team and participated in 2010 FIFA World Cup.

International career
Kucka, a former Slovakia under-21 player, made his senior international debut in a friendly match against Liechtenstein on 19 November 2008. Slovakia manager Vladimír Weiss called him up for the 2010 World Cup despite the fact that Kucka had not played in any qualification matches. He played in three games at the World Cup: against New Zealand, Italy and The Netherlands.

Kucka was called up to the Slovakia squads for the Euro 2016 and Euro 2020 tournaments.

Career statistics

Club

International

Scores and results list Slovakia's goal tally first, score column indicates score after each Kucka goal.

Honours
Sparta Prague
 Czech First League: 2009–10
 Czech Supercup: 2010

AC Milan
 Supercoppa Italiana: 2016

References

External links

 Official website
 
 

1987 births
Living people
Sportspeople from Bojnice
Association football midfielders
Slovak footballers
Slovakia international footballers
FK Železiarne Podbrezová players
MFK Ružomberok players
AC Sparta Prague players
Genoa C.F.C. players
A.C. Milan players
Trabzonspor footballers
Parma Calcio 1913 players
Watford F.C. players
ŠK Slovan Bratislava players
Slovak Super Liga players
Czech First League players
Serie A players
Süper Lig players
Premier League players
2010 FIFA World Cup players
UEFA Euro 2016 players
UEFA Euro 2020 players
Slovak expatriate footballers
Slovak expatriate sportspeople in the Czech Republic
Slovak expatriate sportspeople in Italy
Slovak expatriate sportspeople in Turkey
Expatriate footballers in the Czech Republic
Expatriate footballers in Italy
Expatriate footballers in Turkey
Expatriate footballers in England